Jessie Nilsina Wessel (13 April 1894 – 23 August 1948) was a Swedish actress.

Biography 
Wessel studied at the Dramaten's school from 1914 to 1916, and made her debut during this period as Bertha in The Wild Duck.

In 1928, she married the director and art collector Fritz H. Eriksson. She is buried in the Bromma cemetery in Stockholm County.

Filmography 

 1920: Gyurkovicsarna
 1920: Thora van Deken
 1921: Högre ändamål
 1921: Vallfarten till Kevlaar
 1923: Hälsingar
 1924: Flickan från Paradiset
 1925: Två konungar
 1928: Stormens barn
 1928: The Poetry of Ådalen
 1930: Hjärtats röst

External links 
 https://www.imdb.com/name/nm0921806/

References 

1894 births
1948 deaths
Swedish film actresses
Swedish silent film actresses
Swedish stage actresses
20th-century Swedish actresses
People from Linköping